Shall Noise Upon is the third and final studio album by Apollo Sunshine. It was released on vinyl and digital download on August 5, 2008. A CD version followed on September 2.

History
The record, which went under "Mysteries of the Old Soul" as a working title, was recorded during the summer of 2007 in the Catskill Mountains, in a "house inhabited by spirits" and located next door to the home of the original Uncle Sam. Announcement of the finishing of the record was first announced on the band's website, where this message was posted:

A more formal announcement was made on May 29 by JamBase.com, which officially announced the album's title Shall Noise Upon and the track listing. The album includes Drug Rug, Edan, Viva Viva, and White Flight as guests.

Singles and soundtracks
The opening track, "Breeze", is featured near the end of the film Whip It, and appears on the movie soundtrack.
The song "We Are Born When We Die" features in the episode "End Times" of the TV show Breaking Bad

Track listing
 "Breeze"
 "Singing to the Earth (to Thank Her for You)"
 "666: The Coming of the New World Government"
 "Shall Noise Upon"
 "Brotherhood of Death"
 "Happiness"
 "We Are Born When We Die"
 "The Funky Chamberlain (Who Begot Who)"
 "Wolf Frog White"
 "Money"
 "The Mermaid Angeline"
 "Green Green Lawns of Outer Space"
 "Honestly"
 "Coyote Hearing"
 "Fog and Shadow"
 "Light of the World"

References

Apollo Sunshine albums
2008 albums